Sowdeh-ye Olya (also Romanized as Sowdeh-ye ‘Olyā; also known as Sowdā-ye Bālā, Sowdā-ye ‘Olyā, Sowdeh, and Sowdeh-ye Bālā) is a village in Buzi Rural District, in the Central District of Shadegan County, Khuzestan Province, Iran. At the 2006 census, its population was 329, in 64 families.

References 

Populated places in Shadegan County